Elections to Gateshead Council in Tyne and Wear, England were held on 7 May 1998. One third of the council was up for election and the Labour Party kept overall control of the council.

After the election, the composition of the council was:
Labour 51
Liberal Democrat 15

Election result

References

1998 English local elections
1998
20th century in Tyne and Wear